Credit is an extinct town in Craighead County, Arkansas, United States.

Credit got its start in the 1890s when the railroad was extended to that point. The community's name may a play on words with nearby Cash, Arkansas. A post office called Credit was established in 1896, and remained in operation until 1902.

References

Ghost towns in Arkansas
Geography of Craighead County, Arkansas